West Betuwe is a municipality in the Dutch province of Gelderland.
West Betuwe had 51.948 inhabitants on 1 January 2022. 

The municipality was formed on January 1, 2019, by the merger of the municipalities Geldermalsen, Neerijnen, Lingewaal.

Topography

Notable people 

 Dirk Willems (born in Asperen - died 1569) a Dutch martyred Anabaptist
 Cornelius Jansen (1585 in Acquoy – 1638) the Catholic Bishop of Ypres,  father of Jansenism
 Johannes, Count van den Bosch (1780 in Herwijnen – 1844) an officer and politician; Governor-General of the Dutch East Indies 1830–1833
 Jan Karel van den Broek (1814 in Herwijnen – 1865) a physician based at Nagasaki, in Bakumatsu
 Otto Willem Arnold baron van Verschuer (1927 in Beesd – 2014) a Dutch politician

Sport 
 Jan Kleyn (1925 in Asperen – 2009) a sprinter, competed at the 1948 Summer Olympics
 Hendrik Pieter de Jongh (born 1970 in Asperen) a football manager and former player
 Léon van Bon (born 1972 in Asperen) a retired road racing cyclist, silver medallist at the 1992 Summer Olympics
Selma Poutsma (born 1999) from Deil, a speed skater and gold medallist at the 2022 Winter Olympics

Gallery

References

External links

 
Municipalities of Gelderland
Municipalities of the Netherlands established in 2019